VA-75, nicknamed the Carrier Clowns, was an Attack Squadron of the U.S. Navy. It was established as Torpedo Squadron VT-18 on 20 July 1943. The squadron was redesignated as VA-8A on 15 November 1946, and finally as VA-75 on 27 July 1948. It was disestablished on 30 November 1949. A second squadron also bore the VA-75 designation.

Operational history
24–26 October 1944: The squadron participated in the Battle for Leyte Gulf. On 24 October VT-18’s TBMs flew sorties against a powerful Japanese surface force in the Sibuyan Sea. These attacks contributed to the sinking of the Japanese battleship Musashi, one of the two largest battleships in the world. On 25 October, the squadron’s planes were part of a Fast Carrier Task Force that attacked a Japanese carrier force in the Battle off Cape Engaño. Four Japanese carriers were sunk during that engagement. On the 26th, squadron planes participated in an attack on the Japanese surface force which was retiring from the Battle off Samar.
September–December 1946: The squadron participated in  shakedown cruise in the Caribbean and a goodwill cruise to South America for the inauguration of Chile’s President Gabriel González Videla.

Home port assignments
The squadron was assigned to these home ports, effective on the dates shown:
 Naval Air Station Alameda – 20 Jul 1943
 Naval Auxiliary Air Station Monterey – 28 Oct 1943*
 Naval Auxiliary Air Station Hollister – Nov 1943*
 Naval Air Station Hilo – Feb 1944*
 Naval Air Station Kaneohe Bay – Jun 1944*
 Naval Air Station Alameda – 20 Dec 1944
 Naval Air Station Astoria – 25 Jan 1945
 Naval Air Station San Diego – 22 Apr 1945
 Naval Air Station Quonset Point – 14 Nov 1945
* Temporary shore assignments while the squadron conducted training
in preparation for combat deployment.

Aircraft assignment
The squadron first received the following aircraft on the dates shown:
 TBF-1 Avenger – Jul 1943
 TBM-1 Avenger – Sep 1943
 TBM-1C Avenger – Nov 1943
 TBM-3 Avenger – Feb 1945
 TBM-3E Avenger – 22 Apr 1945
 TBM-3Q Avenger – 6 May 1946
 AD-3 Skyraider – 18 Apr 1949

See also
 Attack aircraft
 List of inactive United States Navy aircraft squadrons
 History of the United States Navy

References

Attack squadrons of the United States Navy
Wikipedia articles incorporating text from the Dictionary of American Naval Aviation Squadrons